Donderskamp Airstrip  is an airstrip near Donderskamp, Suriname.

Charters and destinations 
Charter Airlines serving this airport are:

See also

 List of airports in Suriname
 Transport in Suriname

References

External links
OpenStreetMap - Donderskamp

Airports in Suriname
Sipaliwini District